Amar al-Husn (also known simply  as 'Amar) is a village in northern Syria located west of Homs in the Homs Governorate. According to the Syria Central Bureau of Statistics, Amar al-Husn had a population of 373 in the 2004 census. Its inhabitants are predominantly Christians. The village has a Greek Orthodox Church and a Greek Catholic Church.

References

Bibliography

 

Populated places in Talkalakh District
Christian communities in Syria